Kenneth McKoy Valentine "Kenny" Francis (born 14 March 1950) is a former cricketer from Saint Kitts. He played in one List A match for Glamorgan in 1973 against Surrey at Sophia Gardens in Cardiff. A right-arm fast-medium bowler, Francis took a single wicket in the 48 balls of his first-class career. He also played 26 Second XI matches for Glamorgan and – following a move to the West Midlands in 1975 – Worcestershire. He also featured for the Glamorgan Under-25s, Worcestershire Under-25s and Worcestershire Club and Ground XI, and played league cricket in South Wales.

References

External links
 
 

1950 births
Kittitian cricketers
Glamorgan cricketers
Living people
Saint Kitts and Nevis emigrants to the United Kingdom